Pamilya Valderama is a 1995 Philippine action film directed by Augusto Salvador. The film stars Phillip Salvador and John Regala.

Plot
Bobby (Philip) and his brother Sonny (John) are different from each other. Bobby is an NBI agent, while Sonny works for Don Amado's (Paquito) syndicate, whom Bobby is going after. Little do they know Don Amado will become the root of their sibling rivalry.

Cast
 Phillip Salvador as Bobby Valderama
 John Regala as Sonny Valderama
 Nanette Medved as Marivic
 Paquito Diaz as Don Amadeo
 Shirley Fuentes as Joy
 Amado Cortez as Ariston
 Isko Moreno as Elmer
 Kimberly Diaz as Lani
 Cris Villanueva as David
 Mike Gayoso as Brando
 Eula Valdez as Monica
 Rey PJ Abellana as Clemen
 Edmund Cupcupin as Sgt. Goyena
 Cherry Pie Picache as Carmen
 Dindo Arroyo as Sgt. Efren Morales
 Edwin Reyes as Informer
 Bella Flores as Japayuki
 Tony Tacorda as NBI Chief
 Zandro Zamora as Reyes

References

External links

1995 films
1995 action films
Filipino-language films
Philippine action films
Seiko Films films
Films directed by Augusto Salvador